Nieto (“grandchild”) is a Spanish surname, Neto is the Portuguese version of the name. Notable people with the surname include:

Alfonso Nieto (born 1991), Mexican footballer
Alfonso Nieto Castañón (born 1972), Spanish neuroscientist
Alfredo Diez Nieto (1918-2021), Cuban composer and centenarians 
Amalia Nieto (1907–2003), Uruguayan painter, sculptor, and engraver
Ángel Nieto (1947–2017), Spanish motorcycle racer
Antonio Jesús López Nieto (born 1958), Spanish football referee
Claudio Nieto Jiménez (born 1977), Chilean ski mountaineer and triathlete
Daniel Nieto Vela, (born 1991), Spanish footballer
David Nieto (1654–1728), Jewish Hakham in London
Domingo Nieto (1803–1844), President of Peru
Enrique Peña Nieto (born 1966), President of Mexico
Enrique Nieto (architect) (1880 or 1883–1954), Spanish architect
Ernesto Nieto (born 1940), founder of the National Hispanic Institute
Federico Nieto (born 1983), Argentine footballer
Fonsi Nieto (born 1978), Spanish motorcycle racer
Jamie Nieto (born 1976), American high jumper
Jan Nieto (born 1981), Filipino singer
José Nieto (composer) (born 1942), Spanish musician and composer
Juan José Nieto Gil, (1805–1866), 61st president of Colombia
Johnielle Keith "Kit" Nieto (born 1969), Filipino lawyer and politician
Manuel Nieto (1734–1804), soldier in Spanish California
Matt Nieto (born 1992), American ice hockey player
Miguel Ángel Nieto (born 1986), Spanish soccer player
Pablo Nieto (born 1980), Spanish motorcycle racer
Rafael Nieto Navia (born 1938), Colombian jurist
Rey Joseph "RJ" Nieto (born 1985), Filipino blogger and opinion columnist also known as Thinking Pinoy
Rodolfo Nieto (1936–1985), Mexican painter
Tom Nieto (born 1960), American baseball player and manager 
Victor Nieto (1916–2008), founder and director of the Cartagena Film Festival
Yul Servo (born John Marvin C. Nieto) (born 1977), Filipino actor and politician
Carlos Nieto (footballer) (born 1996), Spanish footballer

Spanish-language surnames
Sephardic surnames

es:Anexo:Nomenclatura de parentesco en español#Nietos